(‘Selected Acts of Persian Martyrs’) is a book by Oskar Braun which was published in 1915 in Kempten. It contains biographical material regarding several saints, including:

Pusai
Mar Abba
Simon of Bet-Titta

References
Holweck, F. G., A Biographical Dictionary of the Saints. St. Louis, MO: B. Herder, 1924.

1915 non-fiction books
German biographies
Christian hagiography